The Florida–Florida State men's basketball rivalry (known as the Sunshine Showdown) is a college basketball rivalry between the two oldest public universities of the state of Florida: the University of Florida Gators and the Florida State University Seminoles. Although the in state rivalry between these two schools is most widely known in football, Florida and Florida State have had some memorable battles in basketball as well.

The two teams first met in 1951, a game in which the Gators won 61–51. The two teams met sporadically from then until 1978. Since then, the rivalry has been played at least once a year. For both teams, it is the only out of conference rival that they play every season.

Florida leads the rivalry overall, 45–28. However, FSU has had success in the series, especially recently, having gone 7-3 against the Gators within the last decade. The most notable FSU win came in 2006 when they upset the 4th ranked (and eventual national champion) Gators in Tallahassee.

Game results

References

External links
Media guide

College basketball rivalries in the United States
Sports rivalries in Florida
Florida State Seminoles men's basketball
Florida Gators men's basketball
1951 establishments in Florida